Roger Federer defeated the defending champion Guillermo Coria in the final, 4–6, 6–4, 6–2, 6–3 to win the singles tennis title at the 2004 Hamburg European Open.

Seeds 
A champion seed is indicated in bold text while text in italics indicates the round in which that seed was eliminated.

  Roger Federer (champion)
  Guillermo Coria (final)
  Juan Carlos Ferrero (withdrew because of a hand injury)
  Rainer Schüttler (first round)
  Tim Henman (second round)
  David Nalbandian (first round)
  Carlos Moyà (quarterfinals)
  Sébastien Grosjean (first round)
  Nicolas Massú (first round)
  Mark Philippoussis (first round)
  Paradorn Srichaphan (first round)
  Martin Verkerk (first round)
  Fernando González (third round)
  Sjeng Schalken (first round, retired because of a leg injury)
  Jiří Novák (first round)
  Tommy Robredo (third round)
  Lleyton Hewitt (semifinals)

Draw

Finals

Top half

Section 1

Section 2

Bottom half

Section 3

Section 4

External links 
 2004 Hamburg Masters draw
 2004 Hamburg Masters qualifying draw

Singles